Addapar  is a river flowing in the Nagapattinam district of the Indian state of Tamil Nadu.

References

See also 
 List of rivers of Tamil Nadu

Rivers of Tamil Nadu
Nagapattinam district
Rivers of India

ta:அடப்பாறு(ஆறு)